Bythinus is a genus of beetle belonging to the family Staphylinidae.

The genus was first described by Leach in 1817.

Species:
 Bythinus macropalpus
 Bythinus niger King, 1866

References

Staphylinidae
Staphylinidae genera